WXMZ (99.9 FM) is an American radio station that is licensed to serve and located in Hartford, Kentucky. The station is owned by Radio Active Media, Inc., and it currently broadcasts an oldies format. The station's studios are located at 314 South Main Street in downtown Hartford and its transmitter is located along Bald Knob Road off US 231 near Cromwell.

History 
Heeding listeners’ calls for a better quality signal on the existing WLLS-AM (later WAIA, now defunct), station owner Hayward Spinks applied for a construction permit to build an FM station for the purpose of simulcasting the station's AM service. Spinks was granted a construction permit from the FCC to build the FM station on May 5, 1971. The station signed on the air on May 18, 1972, as WLLS-FM (Later, jokingly made into the reverse acronym "We Love Lloyd Spivey," in reference to the original sole station operator.) As a simulcast service of WLLS-AM, the station played a country music format from its 6 AM sign-on until 3 PM, then switched to a Top 40 format from 3 PM until sign-off at 10 PM.

In 1982, the station switched to a full country format under the branding LS 106. The station's callsign was switched to WKHB on Oct. 1, 1996. The current WXMZ calls were assigned by the Federal Communications Commission on March 19, 1999. In August 2012, WXMZ moved its signal to its current frequency of 99.9 megahertz where its signal remains to this day, and began broadcasting its current oldies format.

Programming 
In addition to its usual oldies format, WXMZ broadcasts a locally produced public affairs named Lunch at the Z at 12 Noon weekdays. Mornings with Sam Alford can be heard Monday through Friday from 6 to 10 a.m., with local news and weather. The station is also the exclusive radio broadcast home to Ohio County High School Eagles sports broadcasts, including football, baseball and boys’ and girls’ basketball games sanctioned by the Kentucky High School Athletic Association (KHSAA). The station also airs the Caneyville Church of Christ's daily devotion program, The Ancient Landmark, at 10:30 a.m. CT on weekdays.

Coverage area 
In addition to Ohio County, WXMZ's radio signal can also cover significant areas parts of neighboring counties such as Butler, Muhlenberg, McLean, southern Daviess, and nearby portions of western Grayson County, including Central City, Livermore, the southern suburbs of Owensboro, and Caneyville, respectively. Grade B quality signal coverage from WXMZ can also be received as far west as Madisonville, as far east as the Mammoth Cave/Nolin Lake area of Edmonson County, as far south as Russellville, and as far north as the areas along U.S. Route 60 between Owensboro and Hardinsburg.

References

External links
WXMZ on Facebook

XMZ
Radio stations established in 1972
Oldies radio stations in the United States
Ohio County, Kentucky
1972 establishments in Kentucky
Hartford, Kentucky